Deh-e Ali Akbar (also Romanized as Deh-e ‘Alī Akbar) is a village in Jahanabad Rural District, in the Central District of Hirmand County, Sistan and Baluchestan Province, Iran. At the 2006 census, its population was 44, in 8 families.

References 

Populated places in Hirmand County